Michael Robrigado Letts (born 15 February 1985) is an Australian–Filipino rugby union player and is the captain of the Philippines national rugby union team.

Personal life
He was born in Sydney, Australia to an Australian father and a Filipina mother who hails from Bicol.

References 

1985 births
Filipino rugby union players
Living people
Rugby union fullbacks
Australian people of Filipino descent
Rugby union players from Sydney
Philippines international rugby union players